Shukunosawa Dam  is an earthfill dam located in Miyagi Prefecture in Japan. The dam is used for irrigation. The catchment area of the dam is 1.3 km2. The dam impounds about 22  ha of land when full and can store 1210 thousand cubic meters of water. The construction of the dam was started on 1977 and completed in 2003.

See also
List of dams in Japan

References

Dams in Miyagi Prefecture